Lev Semyonovich Tsenkovsky (Leon Cienkowski) (October 1 (N.S. October 13), 1822 in Warsaw – September 25 (N.S. October 7), 1887 in Leipzig) was a Polish botanist, protozoologist, bacteriologist, who was mostly active in Ukraine, then part of the Russian Empire. He was a corresponding member of the Saint Petersburg Academy of Sciences (1881).

Lev Tsenkovsky graduated from Saint Petersburg University in 1844. As a professor, he taught at the Demidov Lyceum in Yaroslavl (1850-1854), Saint Petersburg University, Novorossiysk University in Odessa (1865-1871), and Kharkov University (1872-1887). Lev Tsenkovsky was one of the pioneers of the ontogenetic method of studying lower plants and lower animals. Also, he was developing a concept on genetic unity of flora and fauna. Tsenkovsky was one of the advocates of the teachings of Charles Darwin. He is known to have suggested methods of developing an effective anthrax vaccine. Lev Tsenkovsky contributed to the organization of the first vaccination station in Kharkov in 1887.

1822 births
1887 deaths
19th-century Polish botanists
Botanists from the Russian Empire
Corresponding members of the Saint Petersburg Academy of Sciences
Saint Petersburg State University alumni